Harry Pavlidis is an Australian actor who has appeared in many television series and films. He is also a Brazilian Jiu Jitsu practitioner, wellness coach and yoga instructor. Born and raised in Sydney NSW, Australia. He is of Greek descent and has travelled the world extensively throughout his athletic and creative careers. 

Pavlidis has represented state, national and international level in track and field, rugby league, cricket, American football and Brazilian jiu jitsu.

An acting career that started in 1990, Pavlidis has appeared in such television series as Blue Heelers, East West 101, Home and Away, Stingers, Big Sky, All Saints and Outriders. His film roles include Gabriel, Mr. Nice Guy and Infini.

In recent times, Pavlidis has focussed on giving back to the community his knowledge of overall well wellbeing, encompassing health, fitness, motivation, and nutrition.

References

External links

Living people
Australian male film actors
Australian male television actors
Australian people of Greek descent
Year of birth missing (living people)